{{Infobox mountain
| name             = The Bones
| other_name = Na Cnámha
| photo            = Carrauntoohil and the Beenkeragh Ridge (The Bones) and Caher Ridge (Caher East Top, Caher West Top).jpg
| photo_caption = The Bones (centre, in green) on the Beenkeragh Ridge; Carrauntoohil is back left.  The large scree slope into the lake is Brother O'Shea's Gully.
| photo_size       = 240px
| elevation_m        = 957
| elevation_ref = 
| prominence_m        = 37
| prominence_ref = 
| location         = County Kerry, Republic of Ireland
| range            = MacGillycuddy's Reeks
| listing          = Furth, Hewitt, Arderin, Simm, Vandeleur-Lynam
| map = island of Ireland
| map_caption = Ireland
| label_position = right
| map_size       = 240
| coordinates      = 
| grid_ref_Ireland = V800846
| topo = OSI Discovery 78
| type = Purple sandstone & siltstone Bedrock
}}
It is part of the MacGillycuddy's Reeks in County Kerry, and is a small sharp peak on the dramatic Beenkeragh Ridge, and is sometimes mistaken with The Bone, the north-east spur of Maolán Buí, which descends into the Hag's Glen.

 Geography 

The Bones is the highest point on a narrow rocky arête called the Beenkeragh Ridge, situated between Carrauntoohil  (Ireland's highest peak), and Beenkeragh  (Ireland's second-highest peak), in the MacGillycuddy's Reeks range in County Kerry.  The Beenkeragh Ridge is considered as "intimidating hill-walking conditions", along with the nearby The Big Gun ridge, and is often climbed as part of the Coomloughra Horseshoe.  

The Bones is often confused with The Bone, the north-west spur of the nearby Maolan Bui , MountainViews Online Database reported that to avoid confusion in rescue situations, the Kerry Mountain Rescue ("KMR"), and the Ordnance Survey Ireland ("OSI") advocated for the official name of The Bones to become Na Cnámha on OSI maps.  

The Bones is the 321st-highest mountain peak in Britain and Ireland on the Simm classification. The Bones is regarded by the Scottish Mountaineering Club ("SMC") as one of 34 Furths, which is a mountain above  in elevation, and meets the other SMC criteria for a Munro (e.g. "sufficient separation"), but which is outside of (or furth) Scotland; which is why The Bones is sometimes referred to as one of the 13 Irish Munros. The Bones' prominence qualifies it to meet the Arderin classification, and the British Isles Simm and Hewitt classifications.

See also 

 Lists of mountains in Ireland
 List of mountains of the British Isles by height
 List of Furth mountains in the British Isles

References

External links
MountainViews: The Irish Mountain Website
MountainViews: Irish Online Mountain Database
The Database of British and Irish Hills , the largest database of British Isles mountains ("DoBIH")
Hill Bagging UK & Ireland, the searchable interface for the DoBIH
Ordnance Survey Ireland ("OSI") Online Map Viewer
Logainm: Placenames Database of Ireland

Mountains and hills of County Kerry
Furths
Mountains under 1000 metres